Climate crisis is a term describing global warming and climate change, and their impacts. This term and the term climate emergency have been used to describe the threat of global warming to humanity and the planet, and to urge aggressive climate change mitigation. In the scientific journal BioScience, a January 2020 article, endorsed by over 11,000 scientists worldwide, stated that "the climate crisis has arrived" and that an "immense increase of scale in endeavors to conserve our biosphere is needed to avoid untold suffering due to the climate crisis."

The term is applied by those who "believe it evokes the gravity of the threats the planet faces from continued greenhouse gas emissions and can help spur the kind of political willpower that has long been missing from climate advocacy". They believe that, much as "global warming" drew out more emotional engagement and support for action than "climate change", calling climate change a crisis could have an even stronger impact.

A study has shown that the term invokes a strong emotional response in conveying a sense of urgency; some caution that this response may be counter-productive, and may cause a backlash effect due to perceptions of alarmist exaggeration.

Scientific basis 

While powerful language had long been used in advocacy, politics and media, until the late 2010s  the scientific community traditionally remained more constrained in its language. However, in a November 2019 statement published in the January 2020 issue of the scientific journal BioScience, a group of over 11,000 scientists argued that describing global warming as a climate emergency or climate crisis was appropriate. The scientists stated that an "immense increase of scale in endeavor" is needed to conserve the biosphere, but noted "profoundly troubling signs" including sustained increases in livestock populations, meat production, tree cover loss, fossil fuel consumption, air transport, and CO2 emissions—concurrent with upward trends in climate impacts such as rising temperatures, global ice melt, and extreme weather, which in turn can also have many indirect impacts such as large-scale migration and food insecurity.

Also in November 2019, an article published in Nature concluded that evidence from climate tipping points alone suggests that "we are in a state of planetary emergency", defining emergency as a product of risk and urgency, with both factors judged to be "acute". The Nature article referenced recent IPCC Special Reports (2018, 2019) suggesting individual tipping points could be exceeded with as little as 1–2 °C of global average warming (current warming is ~1 °C), with a global cascade of tipping points possible with greater warming.

Definitions 
In the context of climate change, Pierre Mukheibir, Professor of Water Futures at the University of Technology Sydney, states that the term crisis is "a crucial or decisive point or situation that could lead to a tipping point," one involving an "unprecedented circumstance." A dictionary definition states that "crisis" in this context means "a turning point or a condition of instability or danger," and implies that "action needs to be taken now or else the consequences will be disastrous." Another definition differentiates the term from global warming and climate change and defines climate crisis as "the various negative effects that unmitigated climate change is causing or threatening to cause on our planet, especially where these effects have a direct impact on humanity."

Use of the term

Historical 

Former U.S. Vice President Al Gore has used crisis terminology since the 1980s, with the term being formalized by the Climate Crisis Coalition (formed in 2004).

A 1990 report from the American University International Law Review includes selected materials that repeatedly use the term "crisis". Included in that report, "The Cairo Compact: Toward a Concerted World-Wide Response to the Climate Crisis" (December 21, 1989) states that "All nations... will have to cooperate on an unprecedented scale. They will have to make difficult commitments without delay to address this crisis."

Recent 

In the late 2010s, the phrase emerged "as a crucial piece of the climate hawk lexicon", being adopted by the Green New Deal, The Guardian, Greta Thunberg, and U.S. Democratic political candidates such as Kamala Harris. At the same time, it came into more popular use "after a spate of dire scientific warnings and revived energy in the advocacy world".

In late 2018, the United States House of Representatives established the House Select Committee on the Climate Crisis, a term that a journalist wrote in The Atlantic is "a reminder of how much energy politics have changed in the last decade". The original House climate committee (formed in 2007) had been called the Select Committee on Energy Independence and Global Warming, and was abolished when Republicans regained control of the House in 2011.

Public Citizen reported that in 2018, less than 10% of articles in top-50 U.S. newspapers used the terms "crisis" or "emergency". In 2019, a "Call it a Climate Crisis" campaign urging major media organizations to adopt the term, stated that in 2018, only 3.5% of national television news segments referred to climate change as a crisis or emergency, (50 of 1400), though Public Citizen reported triple that number of mentions, 150, in just the first four months of 2019.

2019 appeared to be a shifting point for the linguistics of climate, correlating with more emphatic language used by U.N. Secretary General's address at the Climate Action Summit; petitioning of news organizations to alter their language by Al Gore's Climate Reality project, Greenpeace and the Sunrise Movement; protests outside The New York Times building to force the change; and a May 2019 change in the style guide of The Guardian.

Following a September 2018 usage of "climate crisis" by U.N. secretary general António Guterres, on May 17, 2019 The Guardian formally updated its style guide to favor "climate emergency, crisis or breakdown" and "global heating". Editor-in-Chief Katharine Viner explained, "We want to ensure that we are being scientifically precise, while also communicating clearly with readers on this very important issue.  The phrase ‘climate change’, for example, sounds rather passive and gentle when what scientists are talking about is a catastrophe for humanity." The Guardian became a lead partner in Covering Climate Now, an initiative of news organizations founded in 2019 by the Columbia Journalism Review and The Nation to address the need for stronger climate coverage.

In June 2019, Spanish news agency EFE announced its preferred phrase crisis climática (climate crisis), with Grist journalist Kate Yoder remarking that "these terms were popping up everywhere", adding that "climate crisis" is "having a moment". In November 2019, the Hindustan Times also adopted the term because "climate change" "does not correctly reflect the enormity of the existential threat". Similarly, Warsaw, Poland newspaper Gazeta Wyborcza uses the term "climate crisis" instead of "climate change", an editor-in-chief of its Gazeta na zielono (newspaper in green) section describing climate change as one of the most important topics the paper has ever covered.

Conversely, in June 2019 the Canadian Broadcasting Corporation updated its language guide to read "Climate crisis and climate emergency are OK in some cases as synonyms for 'climate change'. But they're not always the best choice... For example, 'climate crisis' could carry a whiff of advocacy in certain political coverage". The update prompted journalism professor Sean Holman to say that "journalists are being torn by two competing values right now. The first is our job to tell the truth. We are, over and above anything else, society's professional truth-seekers and truth-tellers. But the second value that we think is important is appearing unbiased, because if we appear unbiased then people will believe that we are telling the truth. I think what's happened here is that large swaths of society, including entire political parties and governments as well as voters, don't believe in the truth. And so by telling the truth, to those individuals we appear to be biased."

In June 2019, 70 climate activists were arrested for demonstrating outside the offices of The New York Times, urging the newspaper to adopt the phrases "climate emergency" or "climate crisis", the demonstration being part of public pressure that swayed the City Council to make New York the largest city to formally adopt a climate emergency declaration.

In May 2019, Al Gore's Climate Reality Project (2011–) promoted an open petition asking news organizations to use "climate crisis" in place of "climate change" or "global warming", saying "it’s time to abandon both terms in culture". Likewise, the Sierra Club, the Sunrise Movement, Greenpeace, and other environmental and progressive organizations joined in a June 6, 2019 Public Citizen letter to news organizations, urging them to call climate change and human inaction "what it is–a crisis–and to cover it like one".

In November 2019, the Oxford Dictionaries included "climate crisis" on its short list for word of the year 2019, the designation designed to recognize terms that "reflect the ethos, mood, or preoccupations of the passing year" and that should have "lasting potential as a term of cultural significance".

In 2021, Finnish newspaper Helsingin Sanomat created a free variable font called "Climate Crisis" having eight different weights that correlate with Arctic sea ice decline, visualizing how ice melt has changed over the decades. The newspaper's art director posited that the font both evokes the aesthetics of environmentalism and inherently constitutes a data visualization graphic.

In a 2021 update to the World Scientists' Warning to Humanity, scientists reported that evidence of nearing or crossed tipping points of critical elements of the Earth system is accumulating, that 1990 jurisdictions have formally recognized a state of climate emergency, that frequent and accessible updates on the climate crisis or climate emergency are needed, that COVID-19 "green recovery" has been insufficient and that root-cause system changes above politics are required. A 2022 update – in the form of a study document available on the Web and reported on by several text-based online news media – concluded that "We are now at 'code red' on planet Earth", warning citizens and world leaders to take necessary actions with information about tracked "recent climate-related disasters, assess[ed] planetary vital signs, and [...] [few broadly outlined] policy recommendations".

Effectiveness 
In September 2019, Bloomberg journalist Emma Vickers posited that crisis terminology—though the issue was one, literally, of semantics—may be "showing results", citing a 2019 poll by The Washington Post and the Kaiser Family Foundation saying that 38% of U.S. adults termed climate change "a crisis" while an equal number called it "a major problem but not a crisis". Five years earlier, U.S. adults considering it a crisis numbered only 23%.

Conversely, use of crisis terminology in various non-binding climate emergency declarations has not been effective (as of September 2019) in making governments "shift into action".

Concerns about crisis terminology 
Some commentators have written that "emergency framing" may have several disadvantages. Specifically, such framing may implicitly prioritize climate change over other important social issues, thereby encouraging competition among activists rather than cooperation and sidelining dissent within the climate change movement itself. It may suggest a need for solutions by government, which provides less reliable long-term commitment than does popular mobilization, and which may be perceived as being "imposed on a reluctant population". Finally, it may be counterproductive by causing disbelief (absent immediate dramatic effects), disempowerment (in the face of a problem that seems overwhelming), and withdrawal—rather than providing practical action over the long term.

Along similar lines, Australian climate communication researcher David Holmes has commented on the phenomenon of "crisis fatigue", in which urgency to respond to threats loses its appeal over time. Holmes said there is a "limited semantic budget" for such language, cautioning that it can lose audiences if time passes without meaningful policies addressing the emergency.

Others have written that, whether "appeals to fear generate a sustained and constructive engagement" is clearly a highly complex issue but that the answer is "usually not", with psychologists noting that humans' responses to danger (fight, flight, or freeze) can be maladaptive. Agreeing that fear is a "paralyzing emotion", Sander van der Linden, director of the Cambridge Social Decision-Making Lab, favors "climate crisis" over other terms because it conveys a sense of both urgency and optimism, and not a sense of doom because "people know that crises can be avoided and that they can be resolved".

Climate scientist Katharine Hayhoe warned in early 2019 that crisis framing is only "effective for those already concerned about climate change, but complacent regarding solutions". She added that it "is not yet effective" for those who perceive climate activists "to be alarmist Chicken Littles", positing that "it would further reinforce their pre-conceived—and incorrect—notions".

In June 2019, the Canadian Broadcasting Corporation updated its language guide to read that the term climate crisis "could carry a whiff of advocacy in certain political coverage".

Two German journalists have respectively warned that "crisis" may be wrongly understood to suggest that climate change is "inherently episodic"—crises being "either solved or they pass"—or as a temporary state before a return to normalcy that is in fact not possible.

Emergency declaration vs. real emergency response

Psychological and neuroscientific studies 
A 2013 study (N=224, mostly college freshmen) surveyed participants' responses after they had read different simulated written articles. The study concluded that "climate crisis was most likely to create backlash effects of disbelief and reduced perceptions of concern, most likely due to perceptions of exaggeration", and suggested that other terms ("climatic disruption" and "global warming") should instead be used, particularly when communicating with skeptical audiences.

An early 2019 neuroscientific study (N=120, divided equally among Republicans, Democrats and independents) by an advertising consulting agency involved electroencephalography (EEG) and galvanic skin response (GSR) measurements. The study, measuring responses to the terms "climate crisis", "environmental destruction", "environmental collapse", "weather destabilization", "global warming" and "climate change", found that Democrats had a 60% greater emotional response to "climate crisis" than to "climate change", with the corresponding response among Republicans tripling. "Climate crisis" is said to have "performed well in terms of responses across the political spectrum and elicited the greatest emotional response among independents". The study concluded that the term "climate crisis" elicited stronger emotional responses than "neutral" and "worn out" terms like "global warming" and "climate change", thereby encouraging a sense of urgency—though not so strong a response as to cause cognitive dissonance that would cause people to generate counterarguments. However, the CEO of the company conducting the study noted generally that visceral intensity can backfire, specifying that another term with an even stronger response, "environmental destruction", "is likely seen as alarmist, perhaps even implying blame, which can lead to counterarguing and pushback."

Related terminology 

Research has shown that what a phenomenon is called, or how it is framed, "has a tremendous effect on how audiences come to perceive that phenomenon" and "can have a profound impact on the audience’s reaction". Climate change and its actual and hypothetical effects are sometimes described in terms other than climate crisis. (Following dates aren't necessarily the first use of such terms.)
 "climate catastrophe" (used with reference to a 2019 David Attenborough documentary, the 2019–20 Australian bushfire season, and the 2022 Pakistan floods)
 "threats that impact the earth" (World Wildlife Fund, 2012—) 
 "climate breakdown" (climate scientist Peter Kalmus, 2018) 
 "climate chaos" (The New York Times article title, 2019; U.S. Democratic candidates, 2019; and an Ad Age marketing team, 2019)
 "climate ruin" (U.S. Democratic candidates, 2019) 
 "global heating" (Richard A. Betts, Met Office U.K., 2018)
 "climate emergency" (11,000 scientists' warning letter in BioScience, and in The Guardian, both 2019), 
 "ecological breakdown", "ecological crisis" and "ecological emergency" (all set forth by climate activist Greta Thunberg, 2019)
 "global meltdown", "Scorched Earth", "The Great Collapse", and "Earthshattering" (an Ad Age marketing team, 2019)
 "climate disaster"(The Guardian, 2019)
 "climate calamity" (Los Angeles Times, 2022)
 "climate havoc" (The New York Times, 2022)
 "climate pollution", "carbon pollution" (Grist, 2022)

In addition to "climate crisis", various other terms have been investigated for their effects on audiences, including "global warming", "climate change", and "climatic disruption", as well as "environmental destruction", "weather destabilization", and "environmental collapse".

See also

 Climate apocalypse
 Climate communication
 Climate emergency declaration
 Climate endgame
 Climate justice
 Environmental communication
 Extinction Rebellion
 Green New Deal
 Media coverage of climate change
 Public opinion on climate change
 School Strike for Climate
 The Climate Mobilization
 World Scientists' Warning to Humanity
 World War Zero

References

Further reading
 
 
  (advertising perspective by a "professional namer")
 
  (Nature joining Covering Climate Now.)
 
  Vol. 58 (3).

External links
 Covering Climate Now (CCNow), a collaboration among news organizations "to produce more informed and urgent climate stories" (archive)
 "Climate crisis", dictionary.com (archive)

Crisis
Crisis
Crisis
2010s neologisms
2020s neologisms